"Ghanniet" "(I sang)" is a single by Amal Hijazi from her debut album Akher Gharam. Although it failed to reach the same status as the album's other singles like "Akher Gharam", "Habibi Oud" and "Rayyah Balak" the song was considered a moderate success, particularly in Lebanon and Egypt.

The song features Hijazi singing and dancing in a nightclub.

2001 singles
Amal Hijazi songs
2000 songs